Tokhota is a rural locality (a selo) and the administrative center of Tokhotinsky Selsoviet, Tlyaratinsky District, Republic of Dagestan, Russia. The population was 625 as of 2010.

Geography 
Tokhota is located 21 km southeast of Tlyarata (the district's administrative centre) by road. Saniorta is the nearest rural locality.

References 

Rural localities in Tlyaratinsky District